HPE COXA is a provider of engineering services and precision manufacturing for automotive, motorsport, automation solution, aerospace and defense sectors.
Its headquarter is located in Modena, core of the Italian Motor Valley.

Company history and accomplishments 
HPE was founded in 1998 by Piero Ferrari, with the aim of providing high end engineering services in the mechanical field. 
In 2009 HPE acquired COXA, a manufacturing firm founded in 1985 and specialized in the high precision manufacturing of niche volumes and prototypes.

Since the acquisition, HPE COXA has doubled its turnover and its 
employees, with a mean yearly growth rate of 24.5%.
Today the company is able to manage for its customers the whole product chain:

	Concept
	Design 
	Simulation
	Prototyping 
	Testing
	Manufacturing

The company currently holds 4 certifications (UNI EN ISO 9001: 2008, UNI EN ISO 14001: 2004, BH OHSAS 18001: 2007, ISO/TS 16949: 2009).

Engineering companies of Italy
Companies based in Modena